is a Japanese actress, model and beauty pageant titleholder who was crowned Miss Universe Japan 2013 and represented Japan in Miss Universe 2013.

Early life
Matsuo is a passionate manga artist.

Miss Universe Japan 2013
Yukimi Matsuo was crowned Miss Universe Japan 2013 at the 16th Miss Universe Japan beauty contest. She was crowned by Ayako Hara (the Miss Universe Japan 2012 Winner). The Miss Universe Japan 2013 beauty contest took place at the Tokyo International Forum Hall on grand coronation night of Monday, 4 March 2013. The MUJ 2013 competition was televised live on the "MUJTV". Yukimi Matsuo represented Japan at the Miss Universe 2013 beauty contest at the 62nd Miss Universe beauty contest.

References

External links 
Official Blog

1987 births
Living people
Japanese beauty pageant winners
Japanese female models
Miss Universe 2013 contestants